Charmilles Stadium was a multi-purpose stadium in Geneva, Switzerland.  It was used mostly for football matches, and was the home venue for Servette FC. The stadium was able to hold 9,250 people and was built in 1930 for the Coupe des Nations 1930 tournament.  During the 1954 FIFA World Cup the stadium hosted four games. It was closed in 2002 before Stade de Genève opened.

Major sports matches

1954 FIFA World Cup

Defunct football venues in Switzerland
1954 FIFA World Cup stadiums
Servette FC
Sport in Geneva
Multi-purpose stadiums in Switzerland
Defunct sports venues in Switzerland